The Pentax Q10 is a rangefinder-styled digital mirrorless interchangeable lens camera announced by Pentax on September 10, 2012. It has minor improvements over the model it replaced—the original 'Q'.

References
http://www.dpreview.com/products/pentax/slrs/pentax_q10/specifications

Q10
Cameras introduced in 2013